Her Great Match is a silent 1915 drama film starring Gail Kane and based on the Broadway play by Clyde Fitch. In the 1905 play the star was stage beauty Maxine Elliott. This film was directed by Frenchman René Plaissetty and released through the Metro Pictures studios then just newly formed. This movie survives and is preserved at George Eastman House Motion Picture Collection.

Cast
Gail Kane - Jo Sheldon
Vernon Steele - Prince Adolph (*as Vernon Steel)
Ned Burton - Mr. Bote
Clarissa Selwynne - Mrs. Sheldon
Lawrence Grattan - Mr. Sheldon
Julia Hurley - The Duchess Louise

References

External links

film herald

1915 films
American silent feature films
American films based on plays
1915 drama films
American black-and-white films
Silent American drama films
Metro Pictures films
Films directed by René Plaissetty
1910s American films